is a Japanese footballer who plays for V-Varen Nagasaki.

Club career

After an eight-seasons spell with Jubilo Iwata, Yamazaki decided to sign with Albirex Niigata.

International career

2010 Asian Games
On 23 September 2010, Yamazaki was selected for the Japan Under 21 squad for the 2010 Asian Games held in Guangzhou, China PR.

Career statistics

Club
Updated to end of 2018 season.

1Includes Emperor's Cup.
2Includes J. League Cup.

International

Awards and honours

Japan
Asian Games : 2010

References

External links
Profile at Albirex Niigata
Profile at Júbilo Iwata 

Ryohei Yamazaki at Yahoo! Japan sports 

1989 births
Living people
Association football people from Chiba Prefecture
Japanese footballers
J1 League players
J2 League players
Júbilo Iwata players
Albirex Niigata players
Kashiwa Reysol players
V-Varen Nagasaki players
Asian Games medalists in football
Footballers at the 2010 Asian Games
Asian Games gold medalists for Japan
Medalists at the 2010 Asian Games
Association football forwards
Association football midfielders